Zeta Centauri, Latinized from ζ Centauri, is a binary star system in the southern constellation of Centaurus. It has the proper name Alnair , from the Arabic Nayyir Baṭan Qanṭūris (نير بطن قنطورس), meaning "The Bright (Star) of the Body of the Centaur". With a combined apparent visual magnitude of +2.55, it is one of the brighter members of the constellation. This system is close enough to the Earth that its distance can be measured directly using the parallax technique. It is drifting further away with a radial velocity of +6.5 km/s.

ζ Cen is a double-lined spectroscopic binary system, which indicates that the orbital motion was detected by shifts in the absorption lines of their combined spectra caused by the Doppler effect. The two stars orbit each other over a period of slightly more than eight days with an orbital eccentricity of about 0.5. The estimated angular separation of the pair is 1.4 mas.

At an estimated age of 40 million years, the primary component of this system appears to be in the subgiant stage of its evolution with a stellar classification of B2.5 IV. It is a large star with nearly 8 times the mass of the Sun and close to 6 times the Sun's radius.

References

B-type subgiants
Spectroscopic binaries

Centaurus (constellation)
Centauri, Zeta
Durchmusterung objects
121263
068002
5231